"Rather Be" is a 2014 single by Clean Bandit featuring Jess Glynne.

Rather Be may also refer to:

 "Rather Be" (The Verve song), 2008
"Rather Be" (1996), a song by Elevator to Hell from Parts 1–3
"Rather Be" (2003), a song by Ivan Smagghe from How to Kill the DJ (Part One)
"Rather Be" (2005), a song by Big Kenny from Live a Little
"Rather Be" (2006), a song by Martine Locke from On the Verge
"Rather Be" (2009), a song by Straw Dogs from Love and Then Hope
"Rather Be" (2011), a song by Benny Benassi and Shanell from Electroman
 "Rather Be" (2011), a song by Mark Wills from Looking for America
 "Rather Be" (2020), a song by Brandy from B7

See also
 Rather Be Rockin', 1979 album by Tantrum
 "There's No Place I'd Rather Be", 2007 song by Kit Chan